DD-15 may refer to:

 ROCS Han Yang (DD-15), several ships of the name
 , a destroyer acquired by the Republic of China Navy in 1954
 ,  a destroyer acquired by the Republic of China Navy in 1974
 , a United States Navy Truxton-class destroyer commissioned in 1903 and decommissioned in 1919

See also
 DDG-15, USS Berkeley 
 DLG-15, USS Preble
 DE15 (disambiguation)
 D15 (disambiguation)